Otto Reiniger (27 February 1863, Stuttgart - 24 July 1909, near Weilimdorf, now part of Stuttgart) was a German landscape painter in the Impressionistic style. Most of his works feature the area immediately surrounding Stuttgart, and he was particularly praised for his depictions of flowing water.

Biography 
He began his studies at the State Academy of Fine Arts Stuttgart, where he worked with Jakob Grünenwald and Albert Kappis. In 1883, he transferred to the Academy of Fine Arts Munich for lessons with Joseph Wenglein. He also married Marie Schraudolph (1867-1951), daughter of Professor . Later that same year, they went to stay in Olevano Romano for several months. The following year, he took more study trips to Italy.

In 1888, he and Marie returned to Stuttgart and he set up a studio there. Much of his success was the result of promotion by his patron, Franz Freiherr von Koenig-Fachsenfeld (1866-1918). He was named a Professor in 1900, but was never given a teaching assignment.

In 1904, tragedy struck when most of his accumulated works were destroyed in a fire. Two years later, he and Marie moved into an estate on the Tachensee, near Weilimdorf, which is now part of Stuttgart. For the last six years of his life, he was a member of the Deutscher Künstlerbund.

Streets in Stuttgart and Ostfildern have been named after him. His works may be seen at the Kunstmuseum Stuttgart and the Heimatmuseum in Korntal-Münchingen, among others. In 2009, to mark the centenary of his death, a major exhibition was held at  near Aalen.

References

Further reading 
 Hans Klaiber: "Otto Reiniger zum Gedächtnis". In: Württemberg. Monatsschrift im Dienste von Volk und Heimat, 1935, pgs.112–117.
 Isabel Grüner: Impressionismus im deutschen Südwesten. Otto Reiniger, Hermann Pleuer, Heinrich von Zügel, Christian Landenberger. , Kunstverein Schwarzwald-Baar-Heuberg, Hausen ob Verena 1997, 
 Otto Reiniger 1863–1909 Katalog zur Ausstellung von 4. Mai-8. Juni 1980. Museum Biberach, Biberacher Verlagsdruckerei, 1980, 27 S.
 Ingobert Schmid: Der Landschaftsmaler Otto Reiniger. Theiss, Stuttgart 1982,  (Monograph with catalog)
 Ingobert Schmid, "Otto Reiniger 1863 - 1909. Impressionismus am Tachensee" (PDF), in: Weilimdorfer Heimatblatt, 31 July 2009, pgs.1–11

External links 

 More works by Reiniger @ ArtNet
 

1863 births
1909 deaths
19th-century German painters
19th-century German male artists
German landscape painters
German Impressionist painters
Artists from Stuttgart
20th-century German painters
20th-century German male artists